William "Meiji" Monroe was an American baseball second baseman in the Negro leagues. He played with Baltimore Black Sox in 1927.

References

External links
 and Seamheads

Baltimore Black Sox players
Year of birth unknown
Year of death unknown
Baseball second basemen